Upper Daradgee is a rural locality in the Cassowary Coast Region, Queensland, Australia.

Geography 
Upper Daradgee is bounded by the Johnstone River to the north-east, east and south-east.

The land use depends largely on the elevation within the locality. In the lower areas closer to the river, the land is used for cropping, mostly sugarcane and bananas. In the higher areas the land is used for grazing on native vegetation.

History 
Daradgee Upper State School opened on 6 February 1931 and closed in 1968. It was at approx 273 Upper Darradgee Road.

Education 
There are no schools in Upper Daradgee. The nearest primary school is Goondi State School in Goondi Bend. The nearest government secondary school is Innisfail State College in Innisfail Estate. There are Catholic primary and secondary schools in Innisfail.

References 

Cassowary Coast Region
Localities in Queensland